Parnell is an unincorporated community located in the town of Mitchell, Sheboygan County, Wisconsin, United States.

References

Unincorporated communities in Sheboygan County, Wisconsin
Unincorporated communities in Wisconsin